BBW may refer to:

Culture and society
 Baba language (ISO 639 code bbw)
Big Beautiful Woman, a euphemism for an overweight woman
Banned Books Week, an awareness campaign by the American Library Association
Big Bad Wolf Books, a Malaysian book fair
Browns Backers Worldwide, an organization of fans of the Cleveland Browns American football team

Entertainment and media
Basketball Wives, a reality television show on VH1
 "BBW" (song), a 2019 song by JPEGMafia off the album All My Heroes Are Cornballs
 BBW Magazine, a magazine about Big Beautiful Woman
Bloomberg Businessweek, an American weekly magazine
 Brave Battle Warriors, a subseries of BB Senshi Sangokuden
Bucharest Business Week, a Romanian weekly newspaper

Brands and companies and organizations
Bath & Body Works, a toiletry company
 Build-A-Bear Workshop, a stuffed animal retailer (NYSE stock symbol BBW)
Belgian Blue Whetstone, a natural Belgian sharpening stone
 bbw University of Applied Sciences, Berlin-Charlottenburg, Germany
 BB Airways (IATA airline code BO; ICAO airline code BBW), Norwegian airline
 Volkswagen BBW engine; see List of North American Volkswagen engines

Other uses
Brake-by-wire, a brake technology in the automotive industry
 Borel–Weil–Bott theorem in mathematics
 banana bacterial wilt 
 Bodarwar railway station (rail station code BBW), Muzaffarpur–Gorakhpur main line
 Broken Bow Municipal Airport (ICAO airport code KBBW; IATA airport code BBW), Broken Bow, Custer County, Nebraska, USA

See also